Wendell L. Ledin Jr. (April 25, 1897 – November 13, 1965) was an American businessman and politician.

Ledin was born in Spring Lake, Isanti County, Minnesota.

He moved with his parents in the late 1890s to Bethel, Anoka County, Minnesota. Ledin lived in Bethel, Minnesota with his wife and family. He served in the United States Navy from 1915 to 1922. Ledin was involved with the Bethel Feed and Produce Company in Bethel, Minnesota. He served in the Minnesota Senate from 1939 to 1954. Ledin died at his son's resort: "Ash River" near Orr, Saint Louis County, Minnesota.

References

1897 births
1965 deaths
People from Anoka County, Minnesota
People from Isanti County, Minnesota
Military personnel from Minnesota
Businesspeople from Minnesota
Minnesota state senators